Ad fontes is a Latin expression which means "[back] to the sources" (lit. "to the sources"). The phrase epitomizes the renewed study of Greek and Latin classics in Renaissance humanism. Similarly, the Protestant Reformation called for renewed attention to the Bible as the primary source of Christian faith.  The idea in both cases was that sound knowledge depends on the earliest and most fundamental sources.

This phrase is related to ab initio, which means "from the beginning".  Whereas ab initio implies a flow of thought from first principles to the situation at hand, ad fontes is a retrogression, a movement back towards an origin, which ideally would be clearer than the present situation.

The phrase ad fontes occurs in Psalm 42 of the Latin Vulgate:

According to Hans-Georg Gadamer, there is evidence provided by E. Lledo that Spanish humanists drew the expression from this source.

Erasmus of Rotterdam used the phrase in his De ratione studii ac legendi interpretandique auctores:

See also 
 Ab initio
List of Latin phrases
 Nouvelle théologie, a 20th-century theological movement that emphasized returning to the sources using the French term ressourcement

Notes

References
J.D. Tracy, Ad Fontes: The Humanist Understanding of Scripture as Nourishment for the Soul, in Christian Spirituality II: High Middle Ages and Reformation, (1987), editor Jill Raitt

External links
Classics

Latin words and phrases